Three Daring Daughters (UK title: The Birds and the Bees) is a 1948 musical Technicolor film directed by Fred M. Wilcox and released by Metro-Goldwyn-Mayer. The screenplay was written by Albert Mannheimer, Frederick Kohner, Sonya Levien and John Meehan.

Plot
It's Tess's graduation day from Miss Drake's School for Girls. During the choir's performance at the ceremony, Tess notices that her beautiful divorcée mother, Louise Rayton Morgan, isn't there. Louise, an editor for Modern Design magazine, is in Dr. Cannon's office after fainting due to being overworked and stressed.

At home after the graduation ceremony, Dr. Cannon has a talk with Louise's three daughters, Tess, Ilka and Alix. He tells them that their mother needs a vacation badly, but the only way she can relax is if she goes without the girls. Louise is reluctant, but the girls convince her to go. They see their mother off on a one-month Cuban cruise. The girls then discuss whether they could bring their father back home and make their mom happy and healthy again.

In reality, Louise has kept the truth about their father from them. He was actually a very uncaring man, who left Louise to raise the girls on her own. They go to see their father's boss, Robert Nelson, to locate their father. Meanwhile, on Louise's cruise, she meets famed pianist and conductor José Iturbi. José is immediately taken by Louise, but she plays hard to get, while having the time of her life. When Louise finally returns home, she has a secret to tell the girls.

Cast
 Jeanette MacDonald as Louise Rayton Morgan 
 José Iturbi as himself 
 Jane Powell as Tess Morgan 
 Edward Arnold as Robert Nelson 
 Harry Davenport as Dr. Cannon 
 Moyna Macgill as Mrs. Smith 
 Elinor Donahue as Alix Morgan  
 Ann E. Todd as Ilka Morgan 
 Tom Helmore as Michael Pemberton 
 Kathryn Card as Jonesy 
 Dick Simmons as Mr. Hollow, Nelson's Secretary 
 Larry Adler as himself (Harmonica Player) 
 Amparo Iturbi as herself

Reception
The film earned $4,010,000 at the box office.

Notes

External links

 
 
 
 
 

1948 films
1940s romantic musical films
American musical drama films
American romantic drama films
American romantic musical films
Films directed by Fred M. Wilcox
Metro-Goldwyn-Mayer films
Films produced by Joe Pasternak
Films scored by Herbert Stothart
1940s American films